Gene E. Snowden (April 7, 1928 – June 10, 2019) was an American politician from the state of Indiana. A Republican, he served in the Indiana House of Representatives and Indiana State Senate in a legislative career spanning from 1964 until his resignation in 1983. He was president pro tempore of the Senate from 1979 to 1980. He served as a Huntington, Indiana City Councilman from 1962 to 1964. He was elected County Auditor in 1988 and Mayor in 1992. He lost reelection as Mayor to Bob Kyle in 1995. It was his first election loss. Gene Snowden died on June 10, 2019.

References

1928 births
2019 deaths
Members of the Indiana House of Representatives
Indiana state senators